The A1198 is a road in Cambridgeshire, England, which runs between the A505 at Royston, and the A1307 on the outskirts of Huntingdon.

Settlements along route
 Royston
 Kneesworth
 Waddon Gap
 Arrington
 Caxton
 Cambourne
 Papworth Everard
 Godmanchester

History

Roman Road
The road follows the route of Ermine Street between the A505 at Royston, Hertfordshire and Godmanchester, near Huntingdon.

20th century
This road was designated as a major road during road classification in 1922, and originally carried the number A14. When the M11 motorway was completed in February 1980, and traffic was encouraged to follow the new motorway and the Via Devana (then the A604, now the A1307 and A14 roads) instead. By 1991, most of the former A14 was renumbered as the A1198, with short section of the route from Huntingdon to Alconbury being renumbered as a spur of the A604.

21st century
In August 2010, Cambridgeshire County Council announced the reduction of the road's speed limit from NSL (60 mph) to 50 mph in areas where concern was raised over the safety of traffic. By 2020 some residential and industrial developments had urbanised sections of the road.

References

Roads in England
Roads in Cambridgeshire